is a spinoff of the mobile game Puzzle & Dragons for the Nintendo 3DS by GungHo Online Entertainment. It was released in two versions simultaneously on July 28, 2016, named the Gods Chapter (神の章) and the Dragons Chapter (龍の章). An anime adaptation by the studio Pierrot began airing on July 4, 2016.

Plot
The story takes place in a fantasy world consisting of humans, Dragonoids and Monsters. There is a relative harmony between the three races. There are also Drops, spherical objects that come out of the planet, which can power up the Monsters. Humans and Dragonoids can take on the role of Dragon Callers if they have the capability to see the Drops, wherein, they form bonds with monsters. Currently, the planet is facing Drop Impacts, occurrences where a large amount of Drops are suddenly generated in a single area (and can also spread), which affects the lands and makes the Monsters berserk. In fact, one of the main duties of Dragon Callers is to settle the Drop Impacts by stabilizing the Drop distribution.

The plot follows Ace, son of King (a powerful Dragon Caller, who is missing right from the beginning of the series) and Rena, who aspires to becomes a Dragon Caller like his father. His journey starts when he starts seeing the Drops and finds an egg of a Tamadra, an almost extinct species and he moves to Dragoza, a region formerly belonging to only Dragonoids, but currently occupied by many Dragon Callers. As the series proceeds, he makes friends with Charo and Tiger, and also many other Dragon Callers, while improving his skills and knowledge. There are also the Ancients, a mix of Dragonoids and Humans, who are the leaders who look after the six regions of Dragoza. There is also Lance, a Dragonoid and a powerful Dragon Caller, constantly coming across Ace (not as an antagonist, though) and who believes that it is the Dragonoids that will save the planet.

The series mainly follows the reason of Drop Impacts, Ace, his friends and many others are trying to figure out the cause of the Drop Impact and to save the planet. Meanwhile, they also need to face Dragonoids at Dragoza, who are suppressing Humans, believing that their race should be the only ones in Dragoza, the only ones who should be Dragon Callers and the only ones who can save the planet.

Characters

Main characters

The main protagonist of the series. Rena and King's son. A justice-oriented boy whose father left him mysteriously some time ago. Amiable and kind-hearted, he seeks to become the best Dragon Caller and, eventually, seeks to defeat Dominion. At first, he doesn't get along with Lance, respecting the white-haired boy but referring to him as a "show-off" several times during the first few episodes. But later, with his own powers growing stronger, he becomes able to fight on par with, and help Lance, and has Lance consider him as equal. This takes off most of the steam in between the two.
Having the blood of Dragonoid in him (his grandmother is a Dragonoid), Ace is able to become one with his monsters, giving him more power. In this form, he is shown to have a red left eye. Initially being unable to control his power, he went berserk. But later, he becomes able to control it to some degree.
His monsters are Tamazo, Ouka, Mystic Dark Knight which evolves to Dark Dragon Knight, Blue Troll, White Dragon, Leviathian and Brave X Dragon (which he obtains from his father). He has three Soul Armours - Ancient Dragon Knight, Horus and Ra.

Ace's rival and a powerful dragonoid. A mysterious youth who shows a cold and calm exterior. He likes scrambled eggs. Referred to as the "Prince of Ice" and considered a prodigy Dragon Caller. Has Dragon Lord Zaerog Soul Armor. He respects Jest and seems to look up to him as sort of a hero figure to the point he is unwilling to consider questioning Jest or his actions.
It is shown Lance holds firm pride in the dragonoid species and in the Guild itself and that he struggles to accept Ace because the boy is human. At first, he was shown to be uncaring about Ace, merely regarding Ace's presence due to the fact Ace had the tamadra Lance had been sent to find. However, as the series grows on, Lance's feelings towards Ace changed, and he respects Ace for his character and power, even being glad for the opportunity to fight Ace during the Battle Cup.
It is shown that Lance lost his parents in a Drop Impact and has since grown up as an orphan under both Devi's and the Guild's care. He was adopted by Vahaton after Daphness picked him up to make him a Dragon Caller. Since the entire village was lost along with his parents, Lance holds a hatred for the person causing this. Assuming that King was responsible, Lance becomes easily succumbs to the power from the Star Fragment, losing his self-conscious, becoming a total puppet in Jest's hand.
Lance also has many monsters under his command, like Pierdrawn, Plesios. His Soul Armour is Dragon Lord Zaerog.

One of Ace's friends from Dragoza. A young boy who seeks to become a great Dragon Caller just like Ace, but is teased a lot because some people thought he couldn't see any drops. A great observer and a friendly individual who became fast friends with Ace upon meeting him. Has been shown to have technological prowess and carries around a tablet with him everywhere so he can relay information to his team-mates on monsters and in-battle occurrences. He became frustrated during the Drop Impact in Crocus City due to his inability to see the drops and protect himself when Lance saved him. However, he later became able to see the drops and became a Dragon Caller alongside Ace. He respects Torlie and is shown to be supportive of the man when he was chosen to be a candidate to become an Ancient. Works alongside Enju, his monster partner and has a Toyceratops Soul Armor.

Ace's partner. A tamadra who arrived to Ace in the form of an egg with a star on it. A mysterious creature who is seemingly the last of his kind alongside Devi. A glutton who has an odd love for boiled eggs considering he himself is referred to as an egg-shaped creature. He likes to argue with Devi and keeps looking down on Devi and Lance.
Although he mostly acts childish and clueless about situations, he is actually a guide to Ace, helping him move in the right direction to develop his skills as a Dragon Caller.
He takes the form of Odin Tamazo when fighting, and even acquires Hino Kagustuchi as a Soul Armour.

Lance's partner. An arrogant devidra who believes firmly in his master and who would do anything to protect him. Argues with Tamazo a lot and is shown to have a vendetta with the tamadra ever since Tamazo ate his lunch. It is revealed that Devi was "cast aside" by a previous owner, and met Lance when he picked the egg. He has been with Lance since his childhood. Then, as Lance was weaker, he called Devi as "Master Devi", but after Lance was taken away from him by the Guild, and then reunited with Devi, he refers to Lance as his "Master".
Devi is asked by the Ancient of Darkness, Daphness, to keep an eye on Lance and Jest. Although not really vocal about it, Devi tries to question Lance about Jest's purpose, though he always gets shot down by Lance.
Devi takes on the form of Devivebub when it does a Cross On.

One of Ace's friends from Dragoza.

A Dragon Caller who seeks to be an idol as well. Although she is a stubborn individual who likes to mock Ace, Charo and Tiger, calling them her assistants, she still cares for them in her own way - giving them warnings, advice and knowledge whenever required. She knew Lance and Sonia from before. Her mentor is Herriot. She has Valkyrie Soul Armour.

Ancients

Ancient of Fire.

Former Ancient of Light.

Ancient of Light and a main antagonist. A mysterious individual who has been shown to be playing sides. Appears as a friendly Ancient who is the head of the Guild and seeks prosperity for humankind and dragonoidkind. This is especially noticeable in his interactions with Ace, in which he is kind and helpful in assisting the boy in whatever he needs. However, despite this facade, there is something much darker to Jest. He is using Ace as a means to help Lance get stronger, encouraging the protagonist to get stronger in order to strengthen his own champion. It is suggested that Jest is manipulating Lance into helping him and is preying on Lance's feelings of dragonoid superiority to have the boy help him willingly. In episode 54, it is also suggested that Jest may have played a part in the Drop Impact that killed Lance's parents. Jest also tried to kill Ace by luring him to the site of a Drop Impact where Ace was then saved by Jest's counterpart, the Ancient of Darkness, Daphness.

Ancient of Water. Lance's adoptive father. Despite Lance being isolated from Vahaton and overall cold-shouldered, it is shown Lance respects his opinions enough to be jealous when Vahaton praised Ace's skills and progress. Vahaton has a tendency to make puns and it is suggested by Tamazo this is the reason why Lance doesn't visit him often enough. 

Former ancient of Wood. He chose Torlie and Klein to become the candidates for becoming the next Ancient of Wood. However, it was hinted that he wanted Torlie to become the Ancient and not Klein.

Ancient of Darkness. A woman who is shown to be cold-hearted but well-meaning. She was the one who took Lance forcibly from Devi and put Lance into the Guild's care under her and Vahaton's supervision. She's the one who told Devi to keep an eye on Lance for mysterious circumstances and the same one who saved Ace when Gest purposely led the boy into a trap. She, unlike her light-oriented counterpart, is blunt and to the point but also justice-oriented and well aware that something more is occurring. Refers to all light-oriented men as being "difficult".

Dragonoids

A dragonoid who works for the SDF.

Morgan's sister and a dragonoid. An energetic woman who also serves as Garnet's master.

Herriot's sister and a dragonoid.

Other characters

Ace's childhood friend.

Ace's Mother.

Ace's Father and Lena's Husband. He is a famous Dragon Caller.

Ace's Grandmother. Following the events of the Battle Cup final, she reveals to Ace that she is a Dragonoid.

Master Timbel's student and the current ancient of Wood following Timbel's passing.

He is the Commander of the SDF and one of the main antagonists of the series.

Anime

An anime television adaptation that is based on the game has been announced to air on TV Tokyo on July 4, 2016. The anime is directed by Hajime Kamegaki at studio Pierrot, scripts are written by Masaru Sato with the music being produced by Yamashita Kosuke. In Episode 27, "Colors" by Lenny Code Fiction became the new opening theme, while "Puzzle" by Natsume Mito became the new ending theme, but it debuted in Episode 30. Episode 52 debuted a new opening called "Montage" by Porno Graffitti, and a new ending call "Colorful Jump" by J*Dee'Z. A second season has been announced.

Funimation began streaming the anime in North America from July 4, 2016, along with a Broadcast Dub. However, as of April 3, 2017, due to an unknown licensing issue between Funimation and GungHo, no other episodes after episode 38 have been available on Funimation, Crunchyroll or any other online streaming services; with the dub also on hiatus.

As of October 30, 2017, Crunchyroll has resumed streaming the series starting with episode 39. Although, there's still no confirmation on when/if the English dub will return.

References

External links
 Official website 
 Official game website 
 Official anime website 
 Official TV Tokyo website 
 Funimation anime site
 

Adventure anime and manga
Anime television series based on video games
Fantasy anime and manga
Funimation
TV Tokyo original programming
Pierrot (company)
Puzzle & Dragons
Japan-exclusive video games
Nintendo 3DS games
Nintendo 3DS-only games
Video games scored by Akira Yamaoka
Video games scored by Kenji Ito
Video games scored by Yuzo Koshiro
Video games developed in Japan
Video games with alternative versions
2016 video games
Video games based on anime and manga